The 1985 Yale Bulldogs football team represented Yale University in the 1985 NCAA Division I-AA football season. The Bulldogs were led by 21st-year head coach Carmen Cozza, played their home games at the Yale Bowl and finished in fifth place in the Ivy League with a 3–3–1 record, 4–4–1 overall.

Yale did not play its annual in-state matchup against the University of Connecticut, scheduled for September 28. Officials from Yale and the city of New Haven postponed the game, and then canceled it, as Hurricane Gloria approached the Connecticut shore.

Schedule

Personnel

Season summary

at Army

References

Yale
Yale Bulldogs football seasons
Yale Bulldogs football